Jacques Henry, known as "Old Jack", (15 May 1942 in Lure (Haute-Saône – 19 November 2016) was a French private rally driver from the 1970s. He was a double champion of France of the rallies on Alpine-Renault A110bis, in 1974 and 1975. He won the S2.0 class at the 1977 24 Hours of Le Mans.

References

External links
 Jacques Henry on Ewrc-results.com

1942 births
2016 deaths
French rally drivers
World Rally Championship drivers
24 Hours of Le Mans drivers